Rhosymedre is the name of a hymn tune written by the 19th-century Welsh Anglican priest John David Edwards.  Edwards named the tune after the village of Rhosymedre in the County Borough of Wrexham, Wales, where he was the vicar from 1843 until his death in 1885.  The hymn tune is seven lines long, with a metrical index of 6.6.6.6.8.8.8.  It appears in a number of hymnals and is sung to a variety of words.

The tune was used by Ralph Vaughan Williams as the basis of the second movement of his organ composition Three Preludes on Welsh Hymn Tunes.  Although best known in this original version for solo organ, it is also well known as an orchestral arrangement by Arnold Foster published in 1938. The prelude has been arranged for other instruments or combinations of instruments, including solo piano, piano duet, clarinet choir and four recorders.

The "Prelude on the hymn tune 'Rhosymedre'" by Ralph Vaughan Williams was played at the Funeral of Diana, Princess of Wales by the request of Lady Sarah McCorquodale. It was also played at the weddings of her two sons: Prince William (in April 2011) and Prince Harry (in May 2018).

In 2008, to mark the 50th anniversary of the death of Vaughan Williams, Richard Morrison (chief music critic of The Times) arranged the piece for string quartet and solo tenor.  The first performance took place in May 2008, with James Gilchrist singing the words of the hymn.

See also
List of compositions by Ralph Vaughan Williams

References

Hymn tunes